Greatest Misses is a compilation album of an American hip hop band Public Enemy. It was released in 1992. It included previously unreleased outtakes (1-6), remixes of previously released songs (7-12) and a live British TV performance (13).

Track listing
"Tie Goes to the Runner"
"Hit Da Road Jack"
"Gett Off My Back"
"Gotta Do What I Gotta Do"
"Air Hoodlum"
"Hazy Shade of Criminal"
"Megablast" (The Madd Skillz Bass Pipe Gett Off Remixx)
"Louder Than a Bomb" (JMJ Telephone Tap Groove)
"You're Gonna Get Yours" (Reanimated TX Getaway version)
"How to Kill a Radio Consultant" (The DJ Chuck Chillout Mega Murder Boom)
"Who Stole the Soul?" (Sir Jinx Stolen Souled Out Reparation Mixx)
"Party for Your Right to Fight" (Blak Wax Metromixx)
"Shut 'Em Down" (Live in the UK)

Song notes
"Tie Goes to the Runner" samples '100 Miles and Runnin' by N.W.A and 'Beats to the Rhyme' by Run-DMC.
"Hit Da Road Jack"'s title is inspired by Percy Mayfield's "Hit the Road Jack", popularised by Ray Charles.
"Gett Off My Back" is a rare (for Public Enemy) excursion into new jack swing and also appears on the Mo' Money soundtrack.
"Gotta Do What I Gotta Do" also appears on the Trespass soundtrack.
"Air Hoodlum"'s title is inspired by Michael Jordan.
"Hazy Shade of Criminal" namechecks serial killer Jeffrey Dahmer.
"Megablast" is the first of two Greatest Misses cuts to originate on Yo! Bum Rush the Show, the other being "You're Gonna Get Yours'.
"Louder Than a Bomb (JMJ Telephone Tap Groove)" also appears on PE 2.0's InsPirEd.
"You're Gonna Get Yours" is Greatest Misses''' second cut to originate on Yo! Bum Rush the Show.
"How to Kill a Radio Consultant" is the first of two Greatest Misses cuts to originate on Apocalypse 91… The Enemy Strikes Black, the other being "Shut 'Em Down".
"Who Stole the Soul?" is Greatest Misses' only cut to originate on Fear of a Black Planet.
"Party for Your Right to Fight" is the second of two Greatest Misses cuts to originate on It Takes a Nation of Millions to Hold Us Back, the other being "Louder Than A Bomb".
"Shut 'Em Down" is from the British TV series The Word. It does not appear on original vinyl issues of Greatest Misses''.

Charts

Weekly charts

Year-end charts

Certifications

References

Public Enemy (band) albums
2010 albums
Columbia Records compilation albums
Def Jam Recordings compilation albums